Odontoglossum luteopurpureum is a species of orchid endemic to Colombia.

luteopurpureum